Federico Delbonis was the defending champion but chose not to defend his title.

Facundo Bagnis won the title after defeating Paolo Lorenzi 2–6, 6–3, 6–4 in the final.

Seeds

Draw

Finals

Top half

Bottom half

References
Main Draw
Qualifying Draw

Internazionali di Tennis Città dell'Aquila - Singles
2018 Singles